Nambor - Doigrung Wildlife Sanctuary is a Morangi located in Golaghat district of Assam in India. This wildlife sanctuary covers an area of 97.15 km2. It is located 25 km from Golaghat town and about 318 km from Guwahati LGBI Airport. The forest type is tropical semi-evergreen with pockets of pure evergreen, interspersed with small forest marshes. The area was declared as a Wildlife sanctuary in 2003. The sanctuary along with Garampani Wildlife Sanctuary (6  km2) and Nambor Wildlife Sanctuary (37 km2) are a part of the Kaziranga-Karbi Anglong Elephant Reserve, which was declared on 17 April 2003, with an estimated area of 3,270 km2.

Biodiversity
Flora Bhelu, Gomari, Ajar, Nahor, Udiyam, Poma, Bon Som etc. It harbors some rare species of orchids.

Fauna elephant, hoolock gibbon, stumped tailed macaque, pig tailed macaque, slow loris, Assamese macaque, rhesus macaque, tiger, leopard, fishing cat, barking deer, sambar, wild pigs, gaur, etc.

Birds white winged wood duck, great pied hornbill, wreathed hornbill, adjutant stork, etc.

Reptiles tortoise, monitor lizard, python, etc.

See also
 Nambor Wildlife Sanctuary
 Garampani Wildlife Sanctuary
 List of protected areas of Assam

References

External links
Nambor - Doigrung Wildlife Sanctuary at touristlink.com/

Wildlife sanctuaries in Assam
Golaghat district
Protected areas established in 2003
2003 establishments in Assam

as:নামবৰ-দৈগ্ৰুং অভয়াৰণ্য